Politico Europe (stylized as POLITICO Europe) is the European edition of the German-owned news organization Politico reporting on political affairs of the European Union. Its headquarters are located in Brussels with additional offices in London, Berlin, Warsaw, Paris, and Frankfurt.

In September 2014, Politico formed a joint venture with German publisher Axel Springer SE to launch its European edition. In December 2014, the joint venture announced its acquisition of Development Institute International, a leading French conference business, and European Voice, a European political newspaper previously part of the Economist Group, to be relaunched under the Politico brand. Among the participants of the launch event on April 21, 2015, was President of the European Council Donald Tusk and President of the European Parliament Martin Schulz.

Politico Europe debuted with its first print issue two days later, on April 23, 2015. The main sources of revenue are advertising, event sponsorship and paid subscriptions with nearly half coming from the subscription business.

In June 2018, the second year in a row, the annual ComRes/Burson-Marsteller survey among EU experts named Politico Europe as the most influential publication on European affairs. Despite its relative newness to the Brussels media landscape, Politico Europe has ranked above established publications such as the Financial Times, The Economist, BBC and the Wall Street Journal, as well as Twitter and Facebook. In August 2021, Axel Springer SE signed an agreement to acquire Politico, including the remaining 50 percent share of its current joint venture Politico Europe, as well as the tech news website Protocol from Robert Allbritton for an estimated value of $1 billion.

Politico Pro 
Politico Pro is a premium politics and policy news service that launched in 2015. The newsletter based subscriptions cover different policy areas such as Agriculture and Food, Financial Services, Healthcare, Trade, Energy and Climate, Technology and Transportation. There are also products that are less industry focused but instead provide information on a certain topic like Brexit, sustainability, data and digitization, the EU Budget or competition. In April 2018, Politico Europe added DataPoint, a research platform that gives subscribers access to presentations and analysis about topics from various policy areas, to its subscription portfolio. Politico Pro’s paid offerings reach 45.000 subscribers. Subscription prices start at 7000 euros a year, but can also be in the high five-digit range.

In July 2018, Politico Europe announced the acquisition of technology from Statehill Inc, and the subsequent launch of a data-driven information platform, Pro Intelligence.

Brussels Playbook 
In March 2018, Florian Eder took over the flagship morning newsletter Brussels Playbook from Ryan Heath, who authored the Brussels Playbook for three years. In September 2017, Politico Europe launched the London Playbook morning newsletter with Jack Blanchard as the lead writer. Brussels Playbook has around 100,000 subscribers, London Playbook has 40,000 subscribers.

In September 2021, Irish journalist Suzanne Lynch and Politico reporter Jakob Hanke Vela replaced Florian Eder, as authors of the Brussels Playbook.

People 
Stephen Brown was named editor-in-chief in September 2019, having already taken over as executive editor from Matthew Kaminski who is now Politico’s editor-in-chief, based in Washington. Brown died suddenly of a heart attack on March 18, 2021. Jamil Anderlini took over as editor-in-chief in October 2021. Shéhérazade Semsar de-Boisséson was the CEO until she stepped down at her own request and was  replaced by Claire Boussagol.

Profile 
The majority of the publication's articles cover the day-to-day business of the European Commission, the European Parliament, the Council of the European Union and the EU's interactions in domestic and international affairs. Politico Europe also publishes profiles of important or influential public figures within the European Union. Politico Europe also organizes and hosts EU-related conferences, seminars, and debates.

See also 

Axel Springer SE
EUobserver
Euractiv
Europe Elects
The Brussels Times
Voxeurop

References

External links 
 

Mass media in Brussels
Mass media in the European Union
Newspapers published in Belgium
1995 establishments in Belgium
Publications established in 1995
English-language newspapers published in Europe